"Almost Paradise... Love Theme from Footloose" is the title of a duet by singers Mike Reno of Loverboy and Ann Wilson of Heart. It is one of several major hits by singer Eric Carmen and lyrics by Dean Pitchford, another being Carmen's song "Make Me Lose Control".

Because both their respective were successful during 1980s, Reno and Wilson were approached to record a duet for the film Footloose.

Background
Officially listed as the "Love Theme from Footloose" on the film's soundtrack, "Almost Paradise" was one of three top 10 hits on the Billboard Hot 100 chart found on the soundtrack; it peaked at No. 7 and spent 13 weeks in the top 40. An alternate version of the song with a slightly different musical arrangement, which has never been released, is used in the film.
Other hits from this soundtrack include the film's title track by Kenny Loggins and "Let's Hear It for the Boy" by Deniece Williams, both of which went to No. 1 on the pop chart. "Almost Paradise" was also a hit on the Hot Adult Contemporary Tracks chart in the United States, where it spent one week at No. 1.  Both singers resumed their respective roles within their bands following this one-off recording.

Chart performance

Weekly charts

Year-end charts

Personnel
Movie Version:
 Mike Reno and Ann Wilson – vocals
 Chas Sanford – electric guitar
 Keith Olsen – bass, acoustic guitar
 Bill Cuomo – keyboards, synthesizer
 Jerry Peterson – saxophone
 Jim Keltner – drums

Album Version:
 Mike Reno and Ann Wilson – vocals
 Chas Sanford – electric guitar
 Keith Olsen – bass, acoustic guitar
 Bill Cuomo – keyboards, synthesizer
 Jim Keltner – drums

Cover versions
 In 1989, Eric Carmen and Merry Clayton released a cover single, which was performed as part of the Dirty Dancing live tour.
 In 1998, the Broadway cast of Footloose performed the song, for the 1998 Broadway musical based on the film.
 In 2011, Victoria Justice and Hunter Hayes performed the song, for the 2011 remake of the original film. Their cover was released on September 22, 2011.
 In 2017, Royce da 5'9, Kxng Crooked, Truth Ali, Iliana Eve, Jonathan Hay, Mike Smith and King Graint all collaborated on "Almost Paradise", a hip-hop interpolation of the original. The song is from The Sins of a Father Playlist compilation and it reached #28 on the Canadian Spotify Charts.

In popular culture
The use of "Almost Paradise" on the daytime soap opera All My Children was a significant factor in the song's success.  
"Almost Paradise" was also used on the daytime serials Guiding Light and Santa Barbara.  
Beginning with the third season, "Almost Paradise" is used as the opening theme song for the reality television show Bachelor in Paradise.
Actress Jessica Biel performed an impromptu cover of the song's chorus during an appearance on The Tonight Show with Jay Leno on July 12, 2007.

See also
 List of Hot Adult Contemporary number ones of 1984

References

External links
 Single release info at discogs.com

1984 songs
1984 singles
2011 singles
Victoria Justice songs
Hunter Hayes songs
Gloriana (band) songs
Male–female vocal duets
Songs from Footloose
Songs written by Eric Carmen
Songs written by Dean Pitchford
Love themes
Columbia Records singles
Atlantic Records singles